RAF Kalyan was a Royal Air Force station located at Nevali village 6 km south of Kalyan, operational during World War II in British India. It was the primary landing ground for the nearby city of Bombay (now Mumbai) as early as 1920, much before the airfields of Juhu and RAF Santacruz were established. Several Fighter Squadrons and support units were stationed at Kalyan from 1942 to 1947.
The field was abandoned after the war.

Current use
The site now hosts a research and development laboratory of the Bhabha Atomic Research Centre (BARC).

See also 
 Kalyan Airstrip

References

Kalyan
Kalyan
World War II sites in India